is a unit of the Japan Air Self-Defense Force based at Iruma Air Base in Saitama Prefecture north of Tokyo. Under the authority of Air Support Command, it operates YS-11FC and U-125 aircraft. Prior to the U-125 the unit operated Mitsubishi MU-2 aircraft.

On April 6 2016 a U-125 aircraft operated by the unit crashed near Kanoya Air Base of the Japan Maritime Self-Defense Force in Kagoshima Prefecture, with all six crew members being killed. It had been checking the base's air navigation aid system.

In 2021 the YS-11FCs and the lost U-125 will be replaced with three Cessna Citation Latitude 680A aircraft.

Gallery

References

External links
Unit homepage 

Units of the Japan Air Self-Defense Force